The discography of American musical comedian Bo Burnham consists of three live albums, one soundtrack, one reissue, two extended plays, and three singles.

Albums

Live albums

Soundtrack albums

Reissues

Extended plays

Singles

Other charted songs

Guest appearances

Notes

References

Discographies of American artists
Comedian discographies